Karol Estelle Kennedy Kucher (February 14, 1932 in Shelton, Washington – June 25, 2004 in Seattle, Washington) was an American pair skater. With her brother, Peter, she won five U.S. Championship titles from 1948 to 1952. Known as "The Kennedy Kids," they won the World Championship in 1950, and the silver medal in the 1952 Winter Olympics.

Competitive highlights
(all with Peter)

References
Note: Peter Kennedy has also been credited as Michael Kennedy
 GoldenSkate: North American Figure Skating Championships: List of Champions
 Skatabase: 1948 Winter Olympics: Pairs Results
 Skatabase: 1952 Winter Olympics: Pairs Results
 Skatabase: 1940s Worlds: Pairs Results
 Skatabase: 1950s Worlds: Pairs Results
 Obituary from the USFSA

1932 births
2004 deaths
American female pair skaters
Figure skaters at the 1948 Winter Olympics
Figure skaters at the 1952 Winter Olympics
Olympic silver medalists for the United States in figure skating
Olympic medalists in figure skating
World Figure Skating Championships medalists
Medalists at the 1952 Winter Olympics
People from Shelton, Washington
20th-century American women
20th-century American people
21st-century American women